Sergey Alayev is a Ukrainian retired footballer.

Career
Sergey Alayev started his career with Yunist Chernihiv. In 1999 he moved to the main club of Chernihiv, where he played 2 matcthes. Here he stayed until 2004 playing 47 matches and scoring 11 goal. In summer 2004 he moved to Polesie Dobryanka without playing and he returned to Desna Chernihiv. In the season 2005–06 he won the Ukrainian Second League. In 2007 he moved to Hirnyk-Sport Horishni Plavni and in summer 2008 he moved to Stal Kamianske. Then he returned to Desna Chernihiv where he played 17 matches and scoring 4 goals. In 2010 he moved back to Desna Chernihiv. In 2013 he played 6 matches LKT-Slavutich Slavutich and in 2015 he moved to Avanhard Koryukivka playing 35 matches and scoring 5 goals.

Honours
Desna Chernihiv
 Ukrainian Second League: 2005–06

References

External links 
 Sergey Alayev at footballfacts.ru

1983 births
Living people
Footballers from Chernihiv
FC Yunist Chernihiv players
FC Desna Chernihiv players
FC Hirnyk-Sport Horishni Plavni players
FC Stal Kamianske players
FC Slavutych players
FC Avanhard Koriukivka players
Ukrainian footballers
Ukrainian Premier League players
Ukrainian First League players
Ukrainian Second League players
Association football forwards